This is a list of New Hampshire state forests. State forests in the U.S. state of New Hampshire are overseen by the New Hampshire Division of Forests and Lands.

The former Gay State Forest was transferred to the Society for the Protection of New Hampshire Forests in 2009.

See also
 List of U.S. National Forests
 List of New Hampshire state parks

References

External links
NH Division of Forests and Lands website

New Hampshire